Sotter Mrittu Nei is a 1996 Bangladeshi film starring Salman Shah and Shahnaz. It became a controversial film regarding its topic. Many a man hanged them to suicide after watching injustice with Salman's character in the film. It was a blockbuster hit and collected almost ৳11.50 crore with adjusted inflation, making it the 3rd highest grossing Bangladeshi film of all time.

Plot
Joy accepts a murder he didn't commit to save his mother's reputation from being found out by the public that she lied about his involvement. However, she saves him from being hanged for the crime after proving his innocence.

Cast
 Salman Shah as Joy
 Shahnaz as Brishti
 Alamgir as Joy's father
 Shabana as Salma, Joy's mother
 Shahrukh Shah as Rana
 Anwar Hossain as Joy's grandfather
 Raisul Islam Asad
 Rajib as Khan E Ali Khan
 Misha Sawdagor as Tiger, Khan E Ali Khan's son
 Tushar Khan
 Babul Ahmed 
 Alka Sarkar
 Sharmin
 Zamilur Rahman Saka
 Dulal Sarkar
 Shila Ahmed
 Sanowar Morshed
 Azharul Islam Khan
 Mozid Bongobashi
 Syed Akhter Ali
 Fokira

References

External links
 

1996 films
Bengali-language Bangladeshi films
Films scored by Satya Saha
1990s Bengali-language films
Films directed by Chaktu Ahmed